Jorge Ali Triana Varon (born April 4, 1942 in Bogotá, Colombia) is a Colombian theatre director and film director.  He studied theater and film in Czechoslovakia and in Berlin. It is one of the founders of the Popular Theater of Bogota in 1967, starting as theatre director, directing more than 50 works. With the TPB, he won several awards that have established him as one of the most important directors in the country. He has also participated in various theater festivals and has directed TV specials, as well as some series of "Revivamos nuestra historia" ("Relive Our History."). He directed over 30 TV series episodes and several short TV films.

Filmography

Films
1985: Time to Die
1996: Oedipus Mayor
2002: Bolívar Soy Yo
2007: Esto huele mal

Television
 Las cuatro edades del amor (1980)
 Bolívar, el hombre de las dificultades (1981) 
 El cuento del domingo (1980)
 El Cristo de espaldas (1987), TV adaptation of the novel by Eduardo Caballero Calderón
 Los pecados de Inés de Hinojosa (TV series) (1988)
 Castigo Divino (1991), TV adaptation through R.T.I. Colombia Television of the novel Castigo Divino (1988) by Nicaraguan writer Sergio Ramírez
 Maten al león (1991), TV adaptation of the novel by Jorge Ibargüengoitia
 Crónicas de una generación trágica (1993)
 Pecado santo (1995)
 Amar y temer (2009)
 Comando élite'', TV series (2013)

Awards
His awards include:
Award for Best Film "OMBU de oro"
Award for Best Latin American Film "OMBU de plata"¸ Festival de Mar del Plata¸ Argentina 2002. 
Spectators' Award¸ Festival de Cine de Touluse¸ France 2002. 
Award of the Ministry of Culture of Colombia. 
Award of Fond Sud Cinema¸ France.

Personal life
He is an atheist.

References

1942 births
Living people
People from Bogotá
Colombian directors
Colombian film directors
Colombian atheists